The 2019 Paris–Roubaix was a road cycling one-day race that took place on 14 April 2019 in France. It was the 117th edition of Paris–Roubaix and the 16th event of the 2019 UCI World Tour. It was won by Philippe Gilbert in a sprint ahead of Nils Politt, with Yves Lampaert finishing in third place.

Teams
As Paris–Roubaix was a UCI World Tour event, all eighteen UCI WorldTeams were invited automatically and obliged to enter a team in the race. Seven UCI Professional Continental teams competed, completing the 25-team peloton.

Result

References

Paris-Roubaix
Paris-Roubaix
Paris-Roubaix
Paris–Roubaix